Leather Jackets is a 1992 film directed and written by Lee Drysdale in his directorial debut. It was shot on Highland Park, Los Angeles, California in 1990. The film stars D. B. Sweeney, Bridget Fonda and Cary Elwes.

Cast
 D. B. Sweeney as Mickey 
 Bridget Fonda as Claudi
 Judy Trevor as Mrs. Little 
 Cary Elwes as Dobbs 
 James LeGros as Carl 
 Neil Giuntoli as Sammy 
 Phil Chong as Vietnamese Bookie 
 Jeff Imada as Hood #1 
 Al Goto as Hood #2 
 April Tran as Vietnamese Grocer 
 Jon Polito as Jack "Fat Jack" 
 Joe Lewis as Barfly 
 Heather Haase as Student Girl #1 (Julie) 
 Mary Ella Ross as Student Girl #2 
 Michael Champion as Costello
 Marshall Bell as The Stranger 
 Chris Penn as Steve "Big Steve" 
 Craig Ng as Tron 
 Bill Ryusaki as Prath 
 Arielle Elwes as "Baby" 
 Lisanne Falk as Shanna 
 Viper as Connie 
 Ginger Lynn Allen as Bree 
 Tony Cecere as Pimp 
 Darryl Chan as Su 
 Alicia Allain-Ryder as "Jingles" 
 Lee Drysdale as A Waiter 
 B. Lee Drew as Tall Cop #1 
 Dee Dee Brown as Party Girl #2

References

External links

1991 directorial debut films
1990s crime drama films
American crime drama films
American independent films
1991 drama films
1990s English-language films
1990s American films